Shirabad Cave is located in the direction of Shirabad-waterfall in Khanbebin.

It is a natural cave in Gorgan province, Fenderesk, Khanbehbin at a height above the Waterfall shirabad in Shirabad.

References 
www.ngdir.ir
www.amphibiaweb.org
calphotos.berkeley.org

Landforms of Golestan Province
Caves of Iran